Pro Wrestling eXpress (PWX, also known as NWA East) is a professional wrestling promotion that was founded in North Versailles, Pennsylvania in 1994 by Jim Miller and Sean "Shocker" Evans. It is the longest-running promotion in the Pittsburgh metropolitan area. PWX was the main rival of Steel City Wrestling during the 1990s and was an affiliate of the National Wrestling Alliance from 1997 to 2012. PWX held a prominent role in the organization during this period. It was part in the annual NWA Anniversary Shows from 1998 to 2000 and brought national and world NWA champions to audiences in the East Coast of the United States. The promotion also collaborated with non-NWA members on the local independent circuit holding several interpromotional shows with Chris Lash's Allied Powers Wrestling Federation (2002; 2009–2010) and participated in Deaf Wrestlefest (2010).

History

Early history

Pro Wrestling eXpress was established by Jim Miller and Sean "Shocker" Evans in 1994. A wrestling school, the PWX Academy, was subsequently opened at the Eastland Mall with B.A. Briggs and Jimmy Valiant as head trainers. PWX also had a weekly late-night television show that aired on WPTT. The first events were held in October and November 1995. The first PWX Heavyweight Champion, B.A. Briggs, won the championship in a tournament held on October 21, 1995, in North Versailles, Pennsylvania. The first PWX Tag Team Champions were crowned in a tournament final on January 8, 1996, in North Versailles, when Sean Evans and Vince Charming defeated Brian Anthony and Paul Atlas. PWX was also one of several East Coast promotions to feature talent from Extreme Championship Wrestling. On December 13, 1996, Blue World Order members Stevie Richards and The Blue Meanie won the PWX Tag Team Championship.

Rivalry with Steel City Wrestling
In late 1997, PWX television announcers Norm Connors and Andrew Lazarchik began holding their own wrestling events in the Pittsburgh metropolitan area under the Steel City Wrestling banner. On September 21, 1997, an interpromotional PWX-SCW show was held at Pittsburgh's Sullivan Hall. Connors and Lazarchik left the company at the end of the year, due to creative differences with PWX management, and began directly running against PWX. This led to a near three-year rivalry that lasted until SCW's close in the spring of 2000.

Joining the National Wrestling Alliance
Around this time, PWX joined the National Wrestling Alliance as NWA East. On October 24, 1998, T. Rantula represented the promotion at the NWA 50th Anniversary Show in Cherry Hill, New Jersey, where he wrestled Abdullah the Butcher. Several NWA East / PWX wrestlers also took part in the NWA 51st Anniversary Show in Charlotte, North Carolina. Brian Anthony wrestled Naoya Ogawa (Universal Fighting-Arts Organization) and Gary Steele (NWA UK Hammerlock) in a Triangle match for the NWA World Heavyweight Championship. Vince Kaplack represented PWX in the "Free For All" battle royal to be named number one contender for the NWA World Junior Heavyweight Championship. NWA East / PWX's The Rage (Samu and Quinn Magnum) battled The Canadian Cartel ("Gorgeous" Michelle Starr and Crusher Carlsen), representing NWA Canada, to a no-contest. This was a semi-final tournament match to determine the top contenders for NWA World Tag Team Championship. A tournament final for the then vacant PWX Tag Team Championship was held at the NWA 52nd Anniversary Show in Nashville, Tennessee which saw Paul Atlas and Jimmy Angel beat Rage to become the new champions.

At one point, PWX was one of three groups under the umbrella of NWA East along with the Pittsburgh Wrestling League and World Legion Wrestling. It was eventually decided to consolidate all three groups into a single company. On June 22–23, 2001, PWX vacated all its championships to create four new titles as part of NWA East. Paul Atlas became the NWA East Triple Jeopardy Champion after defeating Jimmy Angel, Kid Cupid, Kid Ego and Scott Venom. Crusher Hansen defeated J.B. Destiny and Dean Jablonski in a three-way match for the NWA East Three Rivers Championship. The Mon Valley Monsters (Cory K and Big Poppa Gator) beat Armageddon (Rapture and Revelation) in a tournament final to unify the NWA East, Pittsburgh Wrestling League and Pro Wrestling eXpress Tag Team Championships to form the new NWA Pro Wrestling eXpress Tag Team Championship. Brandon K also defeated Dirk Ciglar in a tournament final to unify the NWA East, PWL and PWX Heavyweight titles into the newly formed NWA East Triple Crown Heavyweight Championship. On December 15, 2001, NWA East / PWX hosted the 2001 NWA Clash of the Champions at the McKeesport Sportatorium in which Shinya Hashimoto defeated Steve Corino and Gary Steele in a three-way round-robin "Iron Man" match to capture the then vacant NWA World Heavyweight Championship. After the match, Hashimoto was attacked by a masked wrestler to was revealed to be former NWA world champion Dan Severn. Naohiro Hoshikawa also made his U.S. debut at the event unsuccessfully challenging NWA East Triple Jeopardy Champion Paul Atlas in a Triple Threat match with Nikita Allanov.

In February 2002, NWA East / PWX co-held the Best of the Best Tournament with NWA Tri-State in Titusville, Pennsylvania. Also on the show, Larry Zbyszko defeated Fabulous Frederick, Vito LoGrasso beat NWA Tri-State Champion Magnum in a non-title match, and Rocky Reynolds defeated Jason Rumble to win the NWA World Junior Heavyweight Championship. NWA East hosted a "champion vs. champion" match between NWA East Heavyweight Champion Nikita Allanov and NWA National Heavyweight Champion Ricky Murdock the following year as well as bringing in talent from NWA New Jersey and NWA Virginia.

Relationship with the Allied Powers Wrestling Federation
NWA East / PXW had a close working relationship with the Allied Powers Wrestling Federation based in Commodore, Pennsylvania. The two promotions co-hosted several interpromotional shows together from 2002 to 2010. These early shows had the two companies sharing talent, however, a storyline developed which saw relations between APWF and NWA East become confrontational. A showdown of sorts took place at the McKeesport Sportatorium on July 5, 2002, pitting APWF and NWA East wrestlers against each other. According to the pre-match stipulations, the APWF would receive the contracts of NWA East wrestlers if they won the majority of the matches. If the NWA East wrestlers won the majority, APWF wrestlers would be banned from their shows. Bubba Brewer (APWF) defeated Crusher Hansen (NWA East) in the first bout while Spiffy Sean Stylez (NWA East) won the second bout against Kidd Country (APWF) via disqualification. In the final bout, Jimmy Vega$ and Dr. Feelgood (APWF) beat Dirk Ciglar and Brandon K (NWA East) to win the NWA East contracts for the APWF. The APWF-NWA East war continued throughout the summer. The APWF "invasion" came to an end in McKeesport on August 2, 2002, when J.B. Destiny and Sean Stylez defeated Kid Country and Charlie Mansun. APWF promoter Chris Lash was forced to leave the National Wrestling Alliance as a result.

Notable talent
NWA East / PWX featured a number of wrestlers who were regulars in the East Coast wrestling scene and was the birthplace of Crusher Hanson and Michael Tarver. Like its longtime rival SCW, the promotion regularly featured Pittsburgh "legends" such as Lord Zoltan and T. Rantula as well as many regional "indy stars" such as Bubba the Bulldog, Dennis Gregory, The Hungarian Barbarian, Lou Marconi, Frank Stalletto, Tom Brandi, Darren Wyse and Samu. It also showcased younger up and coming wrestlers including, most notably, Amazing Red, Cody Hawk, Kingdom James, Gregory Iron, Matthew Justice, Ryan Mitchell, Michael Shane, Quinson Valentino, Shark Boy, Sterling James Keenan, Xavier, and The S.A.T. (Jose Maximo and Joel Maximo). Bobby Shields, a former NWA East / PWX Three Rivers Champion, participated in East Coast Wrestling Association's 15th annual Super 8 tournament. Female wrestlers Tessa Blanchard and Stacy Hunter have both had notable roles in the company.

The promotion also featured talent from Extreme Championship Wrestling. Blue World Order members Stevie Richards and The Blue Meanie are former PWX Tag Team Champions. Shane Douglas held the PWX Heavyweight Championship in the summer of 1999. In addition to showcasing national and world NWA champions, Robert Gibson, Larry Zbyszko and other NWA legends have made special guest appearances during the 2000s.

Jon Burton, a sportscaster for SportsRadio 93.7, was recruited by NWA East / PWX promoter Jim Miller to become a "heel" wrestler for the promotion. Burton initially entered pro wrestling for a one-time wrestling match against fellow radio broadcaster Bubba the Bulldog of B94. He won the NWA East / PWX Brass Knuckles Championship twice while competing for the company.

PWX Wrestleplex and television syndication
 
NWA East / PWX held the majority of its shows at the PWX Wrestleplex, located at the Eastland Mall, in North Versailles, Pennsylvania. The promotion moved its events from Eastland Mall, which was demolished in 2005, to the Jacob Woll Pavilion in Renziehausen Park during the mid-2000s. It also held events at The Sportatorium and The Palisades in McKeesport, Pennsylvania. In August 2011, the promotion relocated to McKeesport and established a new home venue, what was dubbed "The New PWX Wrestleplex", at the former St. Stephen's Church fellowship hall and school. The property was in such poor condition that it was necessary for a group of wrestlers, students and other volunteers to do a complete tear out and renovation. The move was officially announced on September 24 at what would be the final show at Jacob Woll Pavilion in Renzie Park. In the main event, NWA North American Tag Team Champions Team MEGA (JR Mega and Ashton Amhurst) successfully defended the title against Patrick Hayes and then PWX Heavyweight Champion Stryder. This was the last NWA East / PWX event in which an NWA championship was contested. On October 29, 2011, the New PWX Wrestleplex was opened to the public. The PWX 17th Anniversary Show featured the return of many alumni and included T. Rantula's induction into the PWX Circle of Respect.

In February 2013, Channel 22 began broadcasting PWX Steel City TV on Saturday mornings. The promotion originally had a late-night television show on WPTT during the late 1990s but had been off local television during the previous decade. PWX Steel City TV was syndicated to Channel 26 in mid-Mon Valley and Channel 56 in Westmoreland County reaching a potential audience of 400,000 viewers. Live shows were filmed at "The New PWX Wrestleplex" using a four-camera setup and a green screen for special features. PXW programming was shown in Western Pennsylvania and parts of Ohio and West Virginia on a total of 12 over-the-air television stations. As of 2015, it is also available online via Roku and Vimeo.

Recent years
On May 2, 2010, NWA East / PWX took part in Deaf Wrestlefest, an annual benefit show for the Western Pennsylvania School for the Deaf, with Patrick Hayes successfully defending his heavyweight title against Ashton Amherst. Amherst, a longtime NWA East / PWX "heel" wrestler, served as the main antagonist in the 2013 comedy horror film Pro Wrestlers vs Zombies. On November 30, 2014, Samu was inducted into the Circle of Respect at PWX's 20th Anniversary Show. Samu wrestled his last-ever match in PWX the following year when he and his son Lance Anoa'i joined Quinn Magnum in a six-man tag team match against Payton Graham, Jack Pollock and Stryder.

In March 2015, the PWX Wrestling Academy was featured in the Pittsburgh Tribune-Review. PWX wrestler Crusher Hanson was profiled by Pittsburgh Post-Gazette a month later. In June 2016, PWX joined Global Force Wrestling and the Renegade Wrestling Alliance for a benefit show at Lackawanna College. Two months later, CBS Pittsburgh named PWX among the best locally based independent promotions along with the Keystone State Wrestling Alliance, International Wrestling Cartel, and Ring of Honor.

Roster
Male wrestlers

Female wrestlers

Referees

Other on-air personnel

Events

Futures Cup Tournament
The Futures Cup Tournament is an annual professional wrestling single-elimination tournament produced by the Pro Wrestling eXpress (PWX) promotion, which has been held since 2011.

Ray Mendez Memorial Tournament
The Ray Mendez Memorial Tournament is an annual professional wrestling single-elimination tournament produced by the Pro Wrestling eXpress (PWX) promotion, which was held from 2005 to 2006. It was held in memory of Ray Mendez, a local wrestling fan, who had died. The winner of the tournament earned a title shot for the NWA East / PWX Heavyweight Championship.

Sean "Shocker" Evans Memorial Tournament
The Sean "Shocker" Evans Memorial Tournament is an annual professional wrestling single-elimination tournament produced by the Pro Wrestling eXpress (PWX) promotion, which has been held since 2008. It is held in memory of Sean "Shocker" Evans, the co-founder of PWX, who died from throat cancer on October 2, 2007. It is traditionally the promotion's second biggest event of the year after the PWX Anniversary Show.

PWX Circle of Respect
The PWX Circle of Respect is an American professional wrestling hall of fame maintained by the McKeesport-based promotion Pro Wrestling eXpress (PWX). It was established in 2006 to honor wrestlers who have wrestled for the promotion.

Inductees

Championships and programming

Current championships

Former championships

Programming

References

External links

NWA East and Pro Wrestling eXpress on Cagematch.net
Pro Wrestling eXpress on OnlineWorldofWrestling.com
Pro Wrestling eXpress on Wrestlingdata.com

Professional wrestling in Pittsburgh
American independent professional wrestling promotions based in Pennsylvania